This is a list of armed conflicts between Ukrainian states or national movements on the one hand, and Russian states on the other.

Chronology of the Russo-Ukrainian wars

Zaporozhian Cossacks
 Polish–Muscovite War (1609–1618) was a conflict fought between the Tsardom of Russia and the Polish–Lithuanian Commonwealth together with Zaporozhian Cossacks.
 Petro Konashevych-Sahaidachny,  Hetman of Ukrainian Zaporozhian Cossacks with his Cossacks army arranged the siege of Moscow during Sahaidachny's March on Moscow in 1618.

Cossack Hetmanate 
 The Muscovite–Ukrainian War (1658–1659) was a war between the Cossack state of Hetman Ivan Vyhovskyi and the Tsardom of Muscovy, which sent troops of Princes Aleksey Trubetskoy and Grigory Romodanovsky to Ukraine.
 Battle of Konotop.
 The Muscovite–Ukrainian War of 1660–1663 was the war of Yurii Khmelnytskyi during the Muscovite-Polish War (1654–1667) against the Tsardom of Muscovy.
 The surrender of the Muscovite army of Voivode Vasily Sheremetev on October 23, 1660, after the Battle of Chudnov. Refusal of the voivode on behalf of the tsar from Ukraine.
 
 The Muscovite-Ukrainian War (1674–1676) was the war of Hetman Petro Doroshenko against Moscow state.
 The march of Petro Doroshenko's troops on the Left-bank Ukraine. June 8, 1668 proclamation of Petro Doroshenko — Hetman of All Ukraine.
 The 30,000-strong Muscovite army and Samoilovych's regiments laid siege to Chyhyryn in 1676. The end of the military campaign against Hetman Petro Doroshenko.
 Northern war in Ukraine in 1708–1712

Ukraine as part of the Russian Empire 

 Suppression of the Haidamak uprising Koliivshchyna in 1768.
  in 1775.
 Kyiv Cossacks insurrection during the Crimean War in 1855.

Ukrainian People's Republic 

 Ukrainian–Soviet War in 1917–1922.
 1919 Soviet invasion of Ukraine was a major offensive of the Soviet troops of the Ukrainian Front against the Army of the Ukrainian People's Republic. 
 Local supporters of Ukrainian People's Republic created anti-Russian and anti-Bolshevik rebellion states on occupied territories like Independent Medvyn Republic and Kholodny Yar Republic. They kept fighting with Russians and collaborators until 1923.
 First Winter Campaign was a campaign by the army of the Ukrainian People's Republic (UPR) against Russian Bolshevik forces December 6, 1919 – May 6, 1920.
 Second Winter Campaign was a failed military campaign by the Ukrainian National Army in October and November 1921 against the Russian Bolsheviks.

Ukrainian Insurgent Army 
 Anti-Soviet resistance by the Ukrainian Insurgent Army was a war of the Ukrainian Insurgent Army against the Soviet Union during and after the Second World War.

Ukraine 
 Russo-Ukrainian War (since 2014) is the military invasion by the Russian Federation in Ukraine, which for 8 years existed as a proxy-war around two breakaway states, before culminating in a full invasion.
 War in Donbas (2014–2022).
 Russian invasion of Ukraine (2022–present).

See also 
1918 Russia–Ukraine negotiations
List of wars involving Russia
List of wars involving Ukraine
List of invasions and occupations of Ukraine

References 

 
Russia–Ukraine military relations
Wars of independence
Russia
wars
wars